Luce-Dyer House, also known as the Stark-Carlson House, is a historic home located at Louisiana, Pike County, Missouri. It was built between about 1856 and 1860, and is a two-story, three bay, Italianate style brick dwelling.  It features a bracketed cornice, gabled roofline, five pairs of semi-circular topped windows with oscula, and pedimented Neoclassical front portico added in the 1930s. Also on the property are the contributing garage and cottage.

It was listed on the National Register of Historic Places in 1982.  It is located in the North Third Street Historic District.

The house was badly burned in July 2016, but it is still standing and is currently being restored.

References

Individually listed contributing properties to historic districts on the National Register in Missouri
Houses on the National Register of Historic Places in Missouri
Italianate architecture in Missouri
Houses completed in 1860
Buildings and structures in Pike County, Missouri
National Register of Historic Places in Pike County, Missouri